Myrmica vandeli is an ant species found sporadically across several European countries (Austria, Bulgaria, the Czech Republic, France, Germany, Great Britain, Poland, Romania, Spain, Sweden, Switzerland, Slovakia, western Ukraine, and the former Yugoslavia). It often coexists with M. scabrinodis. It lives in open, wet meadows. Nests are typically constructed in moss pads. Polygynous colonies may contain 1500 workers. Larvae of Phengaris butterflies may parasitize their colonies.

References
 Csősz S, Markó B, Gallé L 2011. The myrmecofauna (Hymenoptera: Formicidae) of Hungary: an updated checklist North-Western Journal of Zoology 7: 55–62.
 Czekes Z et al. 2012. The genus Myrmica Latreille, 1804 (Hymenoptera: Formicidae) in Romania: distribution of species and key for their identification Entomologica romanica 17: 29–50.
 Szász-Len AM et al. 2011. Habitat preference of Myrmica vandeli Bondroit, 1920 (Hymenoptera: Formicidae) and its place in the ant communities Entomologica romanica 16: 64.

Hymenoptera of Europe
Myrmica
Insects described in 1919